Life on Air: David Attenborough's 50 Years in Television is a BBC documentary film that recounts David Attenborough's television career. It is presented by Michael Palin and produced by Brian Leith.

The BBC first transmitted the documentary in 2002 and is part of the Attenborough in Paradise and Other Personal Voyages collection of 7 documentaries. It includes interviews with Attenborough and several of his former colleagues, along with archival footage.

There is also an autobiographical book of the same title.

Quotes

45 min 10 sec

55 min 0 sec

References

BBC television documentaries
Documentary films about nature